Alec Peters (born April 13, 1995) is an American-born professional basketball player for Olympiacos of the Greek Basket League and the EuroLeague. He played college basketball for Valparaiso University, where he was an All-American in 2017.

High school career
A 6'9" small forward from Washington, Illinois,  Peters was a first-team all-state selection in his final two seasons at Washington Community High School. He selected Valparaiso over larger-conference schools such as Boston College, Missouri and Tennessee.

College career
He immediately became the focus of the team's offense as a freshman, having an eventful season in adjusting to opponent defensive attention and the distraction of serious storms causing destruction in his hometown. As a sophomore, Peters settled into a starring role, averaging 16.8 points and 6.7 rebounds per game. At the conclusion of the season, he was named first-team All-Horizon League. In the 2015 Horizon League tournament, Peters was named tournament MVP in leading the Crusaders to the NCAA tournament.

In his junior season, Peters gained more of a national reputation. He averaged 18.4 points and 8.4 rebounds per game and led the Crusaders to the 2016 National Invitation Tournament final, where they lost to George Washington. At the close of the season, Peters took advantage of looser NBA draft eligibility rules to declare for the 2016 NBA draft. He ultimately chose to withdraw his name and after speculation that he might transfer, he opted to return to Valparaiso for his senior year in 2016–17.

Prior to the start of the 2016–17 season, Peters was named the preseason Horizon League Player of the Year. He surpassed the 2,000 career point mark in a December 28, 2016 game against Chicago State. On March 10, 2017, Peters had a surgery on his right foot, which resulted in him missing the last four games of his college career. At the end of the regular season, Peters was officially named the Horizon League Player of the Year. He led the conference with 23.0 points and 10.1 rebounds per game, being one of two players in Division I games to record an average of 20 points and 10 rebounds that season (the other being Tim Kempton Jr.). He also became the only Division I player that year to be in the Top 20 for both points and rebounds. Peters scored 2,348 total points and grabbed 996 total rebounds in his Valparaiso career, which are both school records.

Professional career

Phoenix Suns (2017–2018)
In the 2017 NBA draft, Peters was selected with the 54th pick by the Phoenix Suns. While Peters was officially named a member of the Suns' 2017 NBA Summer League squad, he ultimately did not play due to a right foot stress fracture he had before working out with other teams properly throughout the NBA's draft process. He officially signed with the Suns on September 18, 2017. His contract would be a two-way deal, meaning he'd split his playing time between Phoenix and their NBA G League affiliate, the Northern Arizona Suns. Peters made his professional debut on October 18, 2017 against the Portland Trail Blazers. After playing in one more game with Phoenix, Peters was transferred to the Northern Arizona Suns affiliate team on October 23, 2017. Throughout this time, Peters would split his playing time between Northern Arizona and Phoenix, mostly playing with the Northern Arizona team in the process. In the last game of his rookie season, he would record a career-high 36 points (including a franchise record-high 8 three-pointers for rookies) and a season-high 9 rebounds in a blowout 124–97 win against the Dallas Mavericks on April 10, 2018. He was the only player besides James Harden that season to record at least 35 points with 8 three-pointers made and 7 rebounds in a single game.

On July 1, 2018, Peters changed his number from 25 to 14 while playing for the Suns in the 2018 NBA Summer League.

CSKA Moscow (2018–2019)
On July 23, 2018, the PBC CSKA Moscow of the VTB United League announced the signing of Peters. He won the VTB League title averaging 6.2 points per game. On July 1, 2019, Peters was officially released from the Russian club.

Anadolu Efes (2019–2020)
On July 8, 2019, Alec Peters signed a one-year contract with Turkish champions and EuroLeague finalists Anadolu Efes. After averaging 4.2 points per game, he left the team on June 30, 2020.

Saski Baskonia (2020–2022)
On July 4, 2020, Peters signed with Saski Baskonia of the Liga ACB.

Olympiacos (2022–present) 
On July 10, 2022, Peters signed with Olympiacos of the Greek Basket League.

The Basketball Tournament
Peters joined Team Hines in The Basketball Tournament 2020.

Career statistics

NBA

Regular season

|-
| style="text-align:left;"| 
| style="text-align:left;"| Phoenix
| 20 || 0 || 11.3 || .378 || .310 || .800 || 1.9 || .6 || .1 || .1 || 4.1
|- class="sortbottom"
| style="text-align:center;" colspan="2"| Career
| 20 || 0 || 11.3 || .378 || .310 || .800 || 1.9 || .6 || .1 || .1 || 4.1

EuroLeague

|-
| style="text-align:left;"| 2018–19
| style="text-align:left;"| CSKA Moscow
| 36 || 18 || 16.1 || .400 || .433 || .893 || 2.7 || 0.7 || .5 || .1 || 5.3 || 4.3
|-
| style="text-align:left;"| 2019–20
| style="text-align:left;"| Anadolu Efes
| 27 || 6 || 13.4 || .676|| .417 || .846 || 2.1 || 0.5 || .3 || .1 || 4.2 || 5.0
|-
| style="text-align:left;"| 2020–21
| style="text-align:left;"| Baskonia
| 33 || 6 || 23.2 || .562 || .447 || .915 || 3.9 || 1.6 || .5 || .2 || 11.5 || 12.5

NBA G League

Regular season

|-
| style="text-align:left;"| 2017–18
| style="text-align:left;"| Northern Arizona
| 35 || 35 || 34.0 || .467 || .411 || .851 || 7.1 || 2.0 || .6 || .3 || 17.6
|- class="sortbottom"
| style="text-align:center;" colspan="2"| Career
| 35 || 35 || 34.0 || .467 || .411 || .851 || 7.1 || 2.0 || .6 || .3 || 17.6

College

|-
| style="text-align:left;" | 2013–14
| style="text-align:left;" | Valparaiso
| 34 || 34 || 29.6 || .490 || .383 || .773 || 4.8 || 1.4 || .9 || .1 || 12.7
|-
| style="text-align:left;" | 2014–15
| style="text-align:left;" | Valparaiso
| 34 || 34 || 30.6 || .489 || .466 || .829 || 6.7 || 1.2 || .7 || .3 || 16.8
|-
| style="text-align:left;"| 2015–16
| style="text-align:left;"| Valparaiso
| 37 || 37 || 32.1 || .505 || .440 || .850 || 8.4 || 1.3 || .7 || .3 || 18.4
|-
| style="text-align:left;"| 2016–17
| style="text-align:left;"| Valparaiso
| 29 || 29 || 35.1 || .466 || .363 || .887 || 10.1 || 2.2 || .8 || .4 || 23.0
|- class="sortbottom"
| style="text-align:center;" colspan="2"| Career
| 134 || 134 || 31.7 || .487 || .416 || .846 || 7.4 || 1.5 || .8 || .3 || 17.5

References

External links
Valparaiso Crusaders bio

1995 births
Living people
All-American college men's basketball players
American expatriate basketball people in Russia
American expatriate basketball people in Spain
American expatriate basketball people in Turkey
American men's basketball players
Anadolu Efes S.K. players
Basketball players from Illinois
Liga ACB players
Northern Arizona Suns players
PBC CSKA Moscow players
People from Washington, Illinois
Phoenix Suns draft picks
Phoenix Suns players
Power forwards (basketball)
Saski Baskonia players
Small forwards
Valparaiso Beacons men's basketball players